Win Lose or Draw is the second studio album released by American rapper and former Fugee Pras Michel. The album was released on August 16, 2005. Only one single, "Haven't Found", was released from the album, on June 16, 2005. The album was entirely produced by Pras and Wyclef Jean.

Track listing
 "Win Lose or Draw"
 "Dreamin'" 
 "Light My Fire" 
 "Dance Hall" (featuring Sean Paul & Spragga Benz)
 "Haven't Found" (featuring Sharli McQueen)
 "For Love" 
 "Mistakes" 
 "Angels Sing" (featuring Wyclef Jean) 
 "Mr. Martin" (featuring Akon) 
 "One Monkey Don't Stop the Show"
 "Friend A' Foe"
 "Party's Ova'" 
 "Ghetto Politics" 
 "How It Feels"

 UK Bonus Track
 15. "Money"

 Japanese Bonus Tracks
 15. "Light My Fire" (DJ Swami Remix) 
 16. "Dreamin'" (Euro Remix)

Production credits
Warren Riker: Engineer, Mixing
Mack 10:  Performer
Wyclef Jean:  Guitar, Producer, Executive Producer
Chris Theis:  Engineer, Mixing
Davis Factor  Photography
Pras:  Producer, Executive Producer, Main Performer
Lisa Michelle:  Stylist
Jayson Dyer:  Assistant Engineer
Dawn Fitch:  Digital Imaging
Veronica Fletcher:  Hair Stylist
A Kid Called Roots:  Producer
Nancie Stern:  Sample Clearance
Mario DeArce:  Engineer
Che:  Producer
Will Quinnell:  Mastering
Rev. Richard White:  Graphic Assistant
Phil Blackman:  Engineer
Brain:  Art Direction
Lenny Kravitz: Guitar

References

2005 albums
Pras albums